This list of fossil fishes described in 2020 is a list of new taxa of jawless vertebrates, placoderms, acanthodians, fossil cartilaginous fishes, bony fishes, and other fishes of every kind that were described during the year 2020, as well as other significant discoveries and events related to paleoichthyology that occurred in 2020.

New taxa

Jawless vertebrates

Placoderms

Acanthodians

Cartilaginous fishes

Ray-finned fishes

Lobe-finned fishes

Research
 A study on the morphology of the osteostracans, evaluating different methods used to determine the morphological variation within this group and its evolution, is published by Ferrón et al. (2020).
 A study on the morphological diversity of osteostracan headshields, aiming to determine the relationship between their morphological diversity and hydrodynamic performance and its implications for the knowledge of the ecological diversity of the osteostracans, is published by Ferrón et al. (2020).
 A study aiming to test the alternative hypotheses of placoderm jaw bone homologies, and evaluating their implications for the knowledge of evolution of jaw bones in early jawed vertebrates, is published by King & Rücklin (2020).
 A study on the fossil dentitions of acanthothoracids is published by Vaškaninová et al. (2020), who report that the teeth of acanthothoracids differed fundamentally from those of arthrodires, and argue that the characteristic traits of acanthothoracid dentition might be ancestral for all jawed vertebrates.
 Redescription of the anatomy of Walterilepis speciosa, based on data from new fossil material, and a study on the phylogenetic relationships of this species is published online by Lukševičs (2020).
 Description of the neurocranial anatomy of Ellopetalichthys scheii is published by Castiello et al. (2020).
 A study aiming to determine whether Titanichthys was a suspension feeder, focusing on mechanical properties of its jaw, is published by Coatham et al. (2020).
 The earliest fossilized vertebrate embryos reported so far, preserved with an adult specimen of Watsonosteus fletti from the Givetian Eday Flagstone Formation (Orcadian Basin; Scotland, United Kingdom), are described by Newman et al. (2020).
 Burrow, Newman & den Blaauwen (2020) describe external spiracular elements in Middle Devonian acanthodians from northern Scotland, differing from spiracles of all known extant and extinct fishes, and report the oldest record of elastic cartilage in the fossil record.
 A study examining the factors influencing the long-term variations of genus-level diversity of elasmobranchs and ray-finned fishes throughout their evolutionary history is published by Guinot & Cavin (2020).
 Carrillo-Briceño et al. (2020) describe a new elasmobranch assemblage from the Oligocene–Miocene boundary in the Dos Bocas Formation (Ecuador), and evaluate the implications of this assemblage for chronostratigraphic inferences and the knowledge of local paleoenvironment.
 Two large vertebrae of sharks belonging to the genus Ptychodus, providing new information on the life history and body size of members of the family Ptychodontidae, are described from the Santonian of Spain by Jambura & Kriwet (2020).
 A study on the evolution of body size in lamniform sharks, including the evolution of gigantism in the lineage of Otodus megalodon, is published by Shimada, Becker & Griffiths (2020).
 Taxonomic revision of the Oligocene and Miocene sand sharks is published by Hovestadt (2020).
 A study aiming to determine the linear body dimensions of Otodus megalodon at different life stages is published by Cooper et al. (2020).
 A study on the class structure of assemblages of specimens of Otodus megalodon in eight previously known formations and in a newly described Miocene locality from northeastern Spain is published by Herraiz et al. (2020), who interpret their findings as indicative of existence of five potential nurseries of these sharks ranging from the Langhian to the Zanclean.
 An isolated tooth of Cosmopolitodus hastalis from the Miocene of South Korea is described by Yun (2020).
 A study on the fossil record of the great white shark from the Pliocene of Peru and Chile is published by Villafaña et al. (2020), who interpret their findings as indicating that great white sharks used the Coquimbo locality in Chile as a nursery and Pisco (Peru) and Caldera (Chile) localities as feeding grounds during the Pliocene.
 A study on the anatomy and phylogenetic relationships of "Urolophus" crassicaudatus is published by Marramà et al. (2020), who transfer this species to the genus Arechia.
 Collareta et al. (2020) describe a fossil stinger a stingray from the Pliocene (Piacenzian) locality La Serra (Italy), twice as long as the longest caudal spines reported from any living stingray species of the Mediterranean Sea, and possibly representing the longest stingray stinger ever reported from both the fossil and the recent records.
 A study on the morphology of the marginal dentition of Lophosteus superbus is published by Chen et al. (2020), who reconstruct the dental ontogeny in this taxon, and evaluate its implications for the knowledge of the evolution of teeth of bony fishes.
 Redescription of the anatomy of Tanyrhinichthys mcallisteri is published by Stack et al. (2020).
 Fragmentary fossil material of Gyrosteus mirabilis is reported from the Toarcian of the Ahrensburg erratics assemblage (Schleswig-Holstein, Germany) by Hornung & Sachs (2020), expanding known geographic range of this species, and representing the first record of a chondrosteid species beyond its type area.
 Redescription of the skeletal anatomy of Yanosteus longidorsalis is published by Hilton, Grande & Jin (2020).
 Revision and a study on the phylogenetic relationships of members of the subfamily Pycnodontinae is published by Poyato-Ariza (2020).
 A study on the skeletal anatomy and phylogenetic relationships of Lombardina decorata is published by Taverne (2020).
 A study on the degree of preservation of the skin of an aspidorhynchid specimen from the Barremian Paja Formation (Colombia), representing the first instance of soft tissue preservation in vertebrates from the Early Cretaceous of northern South America, is published by Alfonso-Rojas & Cadena (2020).
 A study on the diversity and distribution of non-marine teleost fishes in the Western Interior of North America during the late Maastrichtian, based on fossils from the Hell Creek Formation, the Lance Formation and the Scollard Formation, is published online by Brinkman et al. (2020).
 Description of new fossil material of Abisaadichthys libanicus and Eusebichthys byblosi, providing new information on the skeletal anatomy of these taxa, is published by Taverne & Capasso (2020).
 Fossil material of Xiphactinus is described from the latest Maastrichtian Salamanca Formation (Chubut Province, Argentina) by De Pasqua, Agnolin & Bogan (2020), representing the first record of this genus from southern part of South America.
 A methodology for assessing locomotion energetics in extinct bony fishes is presented by Ferrón (2020), who interprets his findings as providing evidence of endothermy in Xiphactinus audax.
 Redescription and a study on the phylogenetic relationships of Laeliichthys ancestralis is published by Brito, Figueiredo & Leal (2020).
 A study on the skeletal anatomy of Pirskenius, aiming to resolve whether Pirskeniidae can be sustained as a separate family, is published by Reichenbacher et al. (2020).
 A study aiming to infer the genetic basis of the reduction of pelvic skeleton in a Miocene stickleback fish Gasterosteus doryssus is published by Stuart, Travis & Bell (2020).
 A fish larva sharing anatomical similarities with the so‐called tholichthys larval stage of butterflyfishes is described from the Eocene (Bartonian) locality of Gornyi Luch (Krasnodar Krai, Russia) by Carnevale & Bannikov (2020).
 New fossil material of Mawsonia gigas, including one of the anatomically most informative specimens referable to the genus Mawsonia, is described from the Mesozoic Tacuarembó Formation (Uruguay) by Toriño et al. (2020).
 New fossil material of Axelrodichthys megadromos is described from several Campanian and Maastrichtian sites in southern France by Cavin et al. (2020), who present a reconstruction of the skull of this species, and study its phylogenetic relationships and ecology.
 Redescription of the anatomy of the skull of Durialepis edentatus is published by Mondéjar‐Fernández, Friedman & Giles (2020).
 Description of new material of tristichopterids from the Devonian (Famennian) locality of Strud (Belgium), and a study on the phylogenetic relationships of tristichopterids, is published by Olive et al. (2020).
 Description of a new, 1.57-metre-long articulated specimen of Elpistostege watsoni from the Upper Devonian of Canada, and a study on the implications of this specimen for the knowledge of the early evolution of the vertebrate hand, is published by Cloutier et al. (2020).
 A study aiming to determine the potential significance of tides for the evolution of bony fish and early tetrapods from the Late Silurian to early Late Devonian is published by Byrne et al. (2020).
 Evidence of enhanced fish production during the extreme global warmth of the early Paleogene is presented by Britten & Sibert (2020).
 A study aiming to determine the impact of changes in the Earth system during the Eocene–Oligocene transition on pelagic fish production and biodiversity is published by Sibert et al. (2020).

References

2020 in paleontology